The True Whig Party (TWP), also known as the Liberian Whig Party (LWP), is the oldest political party in Liberia and one of the oldest parties in Africa. Founded in 1869 by primarily darker-skinned Americo-Liberians in rural areas, its historic rival was the Republican Party. Following the decline of the latter, it dominated Liberian politics from 1878 until 1980. The nation was virtually governed as a one-party state under the TWP, although opposition parties were never outlawed.

Initially, its ideology was strongly influenced by that of the United States Whig Party (from which it took its name). Much of the TWP's support came from the Americo-Liberian community who held an influential position over Liberian politics and society. The TWP's long term leader and President William Tubman was widely regarded as the father of modern Liberia.

The TWP fell out of power following the 1980 Liberian coup d'état in which many of its leading members were killed or fled, ending its dominant position. The TWP ceased to be officially recognized following the coup, although it was never disbanded and continued as a rump party. The party went on to participate in the unsuccessful Coalition for the Transformation of Liberia (COTOL) ahead of the 2005 general election before de-coalition and winning fewer votes at the 2017 elections.

History
The political party was founded in the township of Clay-Ashland in 1869 as a reorganised version of the Opposition Party. It presided over a society in which black American settlers and their descendants, known as Americo-Liberians, though a small minority of the population, constituted nearly 100% of the citizens able to vote. It primarily represented them, often working in tandem with the Masonic Order of Liberia. The party first came to power after Edward James Roye won the 1869 Liberian general election and was sworn in as president the following year. The TWP's historic opponent was the Republican Party. The Republican Party had tended to be supported by Americo-Liberians of mixed African and European ancestry while darker skinned Americo-Liberians initially rallied around the TWP, however as the Republican Party began to decline in influence most Americo-Liberians transferred their support to the TWP.

After Anthony W. Gardiner was elected president in 1878, the TWP went on to govern Liberia for over a century. While opposition parties were never made illegal and Liberia was not classed as a dictatorship, the TWP more or less ran the country as a one party state and held a monopoly on Liberian politics.

The party was accused of endorsing systems of forced labour. In 1930 they sent "contract migrant laborers", under conditions tantamount to slavery, to Spanish colonists on Fernando Pó in Spanish Guinea (now Bioko in Equatorial Guinea). This led to an investigation by the League of Nations, a five-year U.S. and British boycott of Liberia followed by the resignation of President Charles D. B. King. Despite this dispute, the West generally considered the True Whig Party as a stabilizing, unthreatening force in the period after. The US and Britain later invested extensively in the nation under William Tubman's long period of rule (1944–1971).

Under the leadership and Presidency of William Tubman, the TWP took a pro-American stance in international policy, encouraged foreign investment, promoted industrialization and embarked on a mass modernization program of Liberia's domestic infrastructure. This led to a period of economic prosperity during the 1960s, was credited with putting Liberia on the map and establishing the country as a modern power in Africa. Although opponents of Tubman's government accused it of being authoritarian, Liberia was widely regarded internationally as being a stable and successful nation in the region whilst other African states were undergoing civil wars and political strife.

Following Tubman's death in 1971, the TWP leadership and Presidency was taken over by William Tolbert. Tolbert diverted from the TWP's traditional policies by seeking to stress Liberian sovereignty and political independence, as opposed to a nation reliant on international businesses and governments. He initiated some socially liberal reforms, pledged stricter regulation of foreign businesses operating in Liberia, granted official recognition status to opposition parties and tried to re-balance economic disparities between Americo-Liberians and native ethnic tribes. He also pursued open diplomatic and economic relationships with the Soviet Union and shifted Liberia's focus to other African nations as opposed to the West. However, some of these reforms were reversed following the Maryland County ritual killings and the Rice Riots in which Tolbert called for the arrest of opposition leaders. Opposition parties also accused Tolbert of using corruption and political nepotism to retain power while traditionalist members of the TWP and some of Tolbert's cabinet were angered by his initiative of appointing native Liberians into government positions which they saw as usurping their position.

The party lost power after Tolbert was killed in a military coup on 12 April 1980 by a group of AFL soldiers led by Samuel Doe, who formed the People's Redemption Council (PRC). They had opposed Tolbert's clampdown on the political opposition and what they saw as his tolerance of corruption. Many high-ranking officials of the TWP such as E. Reginald Townsend, Frank E. Tolbert (William's brother) and Cecil Dennis were executed, depleting much of its executive leadership whilst others fled the country. The new government subsequently restricted activities of the TWP and it lost its official status; the vast majority of its members and supporters left the party, but other TWP members vowed to continue and it struggled on as a minor rump party without official recognition. Members of indigenous groups began to exert more political power following the coup, in keeping with their dominance in number of the national population, further diminishing the TWP's support which had come from the formerly more influential but demographically smaller Americo-Liberian population. Doe's government also realigned Liberia's foreign policy back to a pro-US position, making it harder to gain international recognition as an opposition group with fears over communist expansionism and the rise of Soviet backed client regimes in Africa during the Cold War. In 1985, all political opposition (including the TWP) were banned following a coup attempt against Doe.

Legacy
In 1991, the party faced a challenge from a new group, which identified as the "National True Whig Party of Liberia." TWP chairman Momo Fahnbulleh Jones threatened legal action to induce the newly founded party to change its name.

The TWP was officially reconstituted in 2005 under the leadership of Peter Vuku.

The TWP participated in the 2005 general election as part of the Coalition for the Transformation of Liberia (COTOL). The COTOL coalition won eight seats but was dissolved the next year after some of its members left to join the ruling Unity Party. The TWP registered to compete as an individual party for the House of Representatives in the 2011 general election, while endorsing President Ellen Johnson Sirleaf's bid for a second term at Presidential level.  However, the party had strife over its leadership five months before the election, and it failed to nominate any candidate for any legislative seat and did not compete as a result.

In 2013, members of the TWP became embroiled in a dispute over Edward J. Roye Building in Monrovia which had been constructed as the party headquarters. The building had been appropriated by the Liberian General Services Agency which provoked anger among TWP members who stated they are still the rightful owners and that Chairman of the Council of State David D. Kpormakpor had decreed that it should be returned to the TWP's possession.<ref>Concerned TWP Members Take Gov't to Court, The Inquirer, 2011.  Accessed 2016-03-16.</ref>

In 2015, the TWP appointed former government information minister Reginald Goodridge as its new chairman and was successfully registered to stand as an individual party for the 2017 election but ended up gaining 0.96% of the vote.

Ideology
The True Whig Party initially sought to emulate the policies of the American Whig Party (from which it took its name) and the philosophy of Whiggism. The TWP was also described as promoting conservatism and black conservatism in the twentieth century during Tubman's rule. Although the party favored protectionism in its early years, it later pursued deregulation, free-market and economically liberal policies known as the "porte ouverte" ("open door") under Tubman to attract investment and stimulate growth. In terms of foreign policy, the TWP took a pro-Western and particularly pro-American stance owing to the fact much of the TWP's support and membership came from the Americo-Liberian population. Although Liberia did not declare war on Germany and Japan until 1944, the party supported the Allies against the Axis powers during the Second World War. Under Tubman, the party was also anti-communist during the height of the Cold War. It later supported America's foreign policy during the Vietnam War and maintained friendly relations with the state of Israel, being among African governments who voted Yes'' to Israel becoming an independent sovereign nation as a Jewish-dominant state. Under the leadership of William Tolbert (who sought to stress Liberia's political independence), the ruling TWP shifted away from a pro-Western stance to a neutral posture by fostering partnerships with other African states and opening up relationships with the Soviet Union, China and Eastern Bloc nations, pursuing liberal domestic policies and attempting to bring more native Liberians into governing circles. These ideological changes caused consternation among both TWP supporters and politicians in Tolbert's administration.

Electoral history

Presidential elections

House of Representatives elections

Senate elections

See also

 History of Liberia

References

1869 establishments in Liberia
Americo-Liberian organizations
Political parties established in 1869
Political parties in Liberia
Parties of one-party systems
Whiggism
Ethnicity in politics